Bischofswerda is a railway station  in the town of Bischofswerda, Saxony, Germany. The station lies on the Görlitz–Dresden and Neukirch West–Bischofswerda railway lines. There used to be also a line to Kamenz.

Train services
The station is served by regional and local services, which are operated by Trilex.

Bus services
These buses depart from the bus station at the front of the station.

 A (Town service)
 B (Town service)
 114 (Bischofswerda – Gaußig – Bautzen)
 177
 178
 180
 181
 182
 183
 185
 188
 189
 191
 193
 264
 305
 306

References

External links
 
 Ostdeutsche Eisenbahn website
 Bus Stand guide

Railway stations in Saxony
Railway stations in Germany opened in 1845
Buildings and structures in Bautzen (district)